Mamasani, short for Mohammad-Hassani, is one of the Lur tribes. The Mamasani tribe consists of four sub-tribes: Rostam, Baksh, Javid, and Doshmanziari. They have their own dialect of Southern Luri.

History 
The founder of the tribe was Mohammad Hassani, which the name Mamasani comes from. Mamasanis claim descent from Zāl, through his son Rostam, and consider them both as the tribe's heroes. Parthian commander Surena is another hero of this tribe. They were a big part of the Parthian Empire and they helped fight Alexander the Great's army. They migrated to Fars province and Sistan and Baluchestan province when the Parthians took control of those lands. The tribe lives in Mamasani, Rostam, Sepidan, Kazerun, Kuhchenar, Marvdasht, Farashband, Fasa, and Shiraz counties in Fars province, as well as in parts of Kohgiluyeh and Boyer-Ahmad province. The Mamasani tribe consists of four tribes: Rostam, Beksh, Javid and Deshman Ziari. According to the 2008 census of nomadic tribes, only 15,377 Mamasanis still live nomadic lives, and the rest are urban dwellers.

Sub-tribes 
The four main sub-tribes are Javid, Baksh, Rostam, and Doshmanziari, and many clans within those sub-tribes.

Language 
The Mamasani Lurs speak their own dialect of southern Luri, as well as Persian as a second language.

References

Indigenous peoples of Western Asia
Iranian peoples
Luri tribes
Shia communities